Bennet Van Syckel (April 17, 1830 – December 19, 1921) was an associate justice of the New Jersey Supreme Court from 1869 to 1904.

Van Syckel was born on April 17, 1830, in Bethlehem Township, New Jersey, the son of Aaron Van Syckel and Mary ( Bird).

He graduated Princeton University in 1846 and was the oldest living member of his class when he died. He was admitted to bar and in 1851 began his practice in Flemington.

He served as  Justice of  Supreme Court of the New Jersey from 1869 to 1904.

He died December 19, 1921 and was interred at Riverview Cemetery in Trenton, where he resided.

See also
 New Jersey Court of Errors and Appeals
 Courts of New Jersey
 List of justices of the Supreme Court of New Jersey

References

External links
 Van Syckel, Bennett New Jersey State Library
 

1830 births
1921 deaths
People from Bethlehem Township, New Jersey
Princeton University alumni
Justices of the Supreme Court of New Jersey
Politicians from Trenton, New Jersey